Back to the Past (Chinese: 尋秦記) is an upcoming Hong Kong historical science fiction action film directed by Ng Yuen-fai and Jack Lai, with action direction by Sammo Hung. The film is a continuation of the 2001 television series, A Step into the Past, which was based on Huang Yi's novel, The Chronicles of Searching Qin. It stars the original cast members of the series Louis Koo, Jessica Hsuan, Raymond Lam, Sonija Kwok, Joyce Tang and Michelle Saram reprising their roles from the series. Produced by Koo's One Cool Film Production, filming for Back to the Past in April 2019 in Guizhou and wrapped up on 7 July 2019.

On 16 March 2021, the first teaser trailer for the film was released.

Plot
After being wrongfully imprisoned for many years, Ken swears to travel back to the past and become the Emperor to make up the life wasted while incarcerated. Back in the Qin dynasty, although Hong Siu-lung have been living in recluse with his family, his protege, Qin Shi Huang Ying Ching still keeps an eye on his every move. Just when Qin Shi Huang was uniting the six kingdoms, Ken makes a surprise attack on him, he has no choice but to go to his former mentor. Hong and Ying meet again for the first time in twenty years, along with time traveller Ken who swears to alter history, the three will most definitely stir up a crisis in the Qin dynasty that will change the destiny.

Cast
Louis Koo as Hong Siu-lung
Jessica Hsuan as Wu Ting-fong
Raymond Lam as Ying Ching
Sonija Kwok as Kam Ching
Joyce Tang as Sin-yau
Michelle Saram as Princess Chiu Sin
Kevin Chu
Louis Cheung
Jimmy Au as To Fong (陶方)
Wong Man-piu as Tang Yik (滕翼)
Liu Kai-chi as Professor Wu Yau (烏有博士)
John Tang as Lee Siu-chiu (李小超) 
Timmy Hung

Production

Development
For many years, Louis Koo has expressed interest in adapting A Step into the Past to the big screen. Koo's film production company, One Cool Film Production, was able to acquire the rights the series in 2015 and a film version of the series was greenlit.

In March 2018, it was announced that aside from Koo, Jessica Hsuan and Raymond Lam will also be reprising their roles from the series and production was to begin at the end if 2018 with budget of US$45 million. Jack Lai will be set to direct and make his directoral debut.

In February 2019, it was announced that Sammo Hung will serve as the film's action director.

On 18 March 2019, the film was promoted at the 2019 Hong Kong FILMART. Aside from Koo, Hsuan and Lam, series cast members Joyce Tang and Michelle Saram were also present at the event, confirming their participation in the film. Visual effects artists Ng Yuen-fai will also co-direct the film with Lai.

Filming
Principal photography for Back to the Past began in April 2019 in Guizhou. On 12 April 2019, photos from the set were revealed, showing Koo's costume. Production for the film officially wrapped on 7 July 2019.

See also
Sammo Hung filmography
List of films based on television programs

References

External links
Official website at One Cool Film
Back to the Past on Douban
Back to the Past at AsianFilmFans

Upcoming films
Cultural depictions of Qin Shi Huang
Hong Kong science fiction action films
Hong Kong martial arts films
Hong Kong historical films
Martial arts science fiction films
Wuxia films
Cantonese-language films
Upcoming directorial debut films
Films based on Chinese novels
Films based on television series
Films about time travel
Films set in the Warring States period
Films shot in Guizhou